Dorcadion nikolaevi is a species of beetle in the family Cerambycidae. It was described by Mikhail Leontievich Danilevsky in 1995.

References

nikolaevi
Beetles described in 1995